The Galați Skating Rink or the Galați Artificial Skating Rink, is a multi-purpose hall in Galaţi, Romania. It is frequently used for concerts, indoor sports such as ice hockey, exhibitions and shows. The hall has a seating capacity of 5,000 people. It is home to the CSM Dunărea Galaţi ice hockey team.

References

Indoor arenas in Romania
Indoor ice hockey venues in Romania
Buildings and structures in Galați